The women's 10,000 metres walk event at the 1987 Pan American Games was held in Indianapolis, United States on 12 August. It was the first time that a women's race walking event was contested at the Games.

Results

References

Athletics at the 1987 Pan American Games
1987
Pan